The Aquila was a nine-cylinder single-row radial aircraft engine designed by the Bristol Engine Company starting in 1934. A sleeve valve engine, its basic design was developed from the Bristol Perseus. The Aquila was never used in production, but further developments led to the Bristol Hercules, Bristol Taurus, and Bristol Centaurus.

Design and development
The Aquila was developed two years after the somewhat larger Perseus, both being sleeve valve designs. The primary difference was in size, the Perseus being based on the  cylinder used in the Mercury engine, while the Aquila used a new and smaller  sized cylinder. The result was a reduction in displacement from 1520 to 950 cubic inches (24.9 to 15.6 L).

The first Aquila engine delivered a modest , which was unspectacular for an engine of this size. This would have made it an excellent replacement for the Bristol Jupiter, which ended production at  three years earlier, but by this time almost all interest was on ever-larger engines.

Applications
Note:
 Bristol Bulldog
 Bristol Bullpup
 Bristol Type 143
 Vickers Venom

Specifications (Aquila I)

See also

References

Notes

Bibliography
Gunston, Bill. World Encyclopedia of Aero Engines: From the Pioneers to the Present Day. 5th edition, Stroud, UK: Sutton, 2006. 
Lumsden, Alec. British Piston Engines and Their Aircraft. Marlborough, UK: Airlife Publishing, 2003. .

Aircraft air-cooled radial piston engines
Aquila
1930s aircraft piston engines